Filone is a classic everyday Italian yeast bread, with a texture and crumb similar to the French baguette.

The name of the bread comes from the Italian word "filo", which means "line".

See also

 List of Italian dishes

Yeast breads
Italian breads